Traina is a surname. Notable people with the surname include:

Angelo Traina (1889-1971), American Biblical scholar
Francesco Traina (1578–1651), Italian Roman Catholic bishop
Geraldine Traina (1936–2011), American feminist
Giusto Traina (born 1959), Italian ancient historian and Byzantinist
Jackie Traina (born 1991), American softball player
John Traina, American soccer player 
Nick Traina (1978–1997), American singer
Todd Traina, American film producer
Trevor Traina (born 1968), American entrepreneur and diplomat